Jeroen van Dillewijn is a Dutch curler.

Teams

References

External links

Living people
Dutch male curlers
Year of birth missing (living people)
Place of birth missing (living people)